Lucille Wilcox Joullin  (1876–1924) was an American painter known for her landscapes of California and the Pueblo Indians of New Mexico.

Biography
Lucille (or Lucile) Wilcox Joullin was born in Geneseo, Illinois on September 6, 1876. She worked with John Vanderpoel at the Art Institute of Chicago. In 1894, she went to San Francisco. Her first marriage was to artist Jules Mersfelder. Her second was to Amédée Joullin (a painter himself) in 1907. The couple went on an extended honeymoon in Paris, returning to San Francisco in 1909. After the death of her husband in 1917, she married Edward H. Benjamin, a mining engineer, and spent long periods in New Mexico. She lived in San Francisco until her death on June 5, 1924.

Exhibitions
 San Francisco Art Association, 1905.
 Mark Hopkins Institute of Art, 1906.
 Sketch Club (San Francisco), 1906.
 Paris Salon, 1908.
 Rabjohn & Morcom (San Francisco), 1915 (solo).
 Kanst Galleries (Los Angeles), 1923.

Museum collection
 Southwest Museum. Los Angeles.

Notes

References
 Phil Kovinick, Marian Yoshiki-Kovinick, An encyclopedia of women artists of the American West. University of Texas Press. 1998.
 George Wharton James, New Mexico, the land of the delight makers. The Page company. 1920.
 Robert R. Preato, The genius of the fair muse: painting and sculpture : celebrating American women artists 1875 to 1945. Grand Central Art Galleries. 1987.

External links

 Lucille Wilcox Joullin Benjamin on Askart 
 Lucille Wilcox Joullin on America's Distinguished Artists 

1876 births
1924 deaths
History of New Mexico
19th-century American painters
20th-century American painters
Artists from San Francisco
People from Geneseo, Illinois
Painters from Illinois
American women painters
20th-century American women artists
19th-century American women artists